Belk is an unincorporated community in DeKalb County, in the U.S. state of Tennessee.

History
A post office was established at Belk in 1893, and remained in operation until it was discontinued in 1908. The name Belk was the maiden name of the first postmaster's wife.

References

Unincorporated communities in DeKalb County, Tennessee
Unincorporated communities in Tennessee